Allah Ditta (born 7 February 1977) is a former Pakistani hurdler.

Ditta first competed internationally at the 2002 Commonwealth Games in Manchester, England. Representing Pakistan, he finished in 5th in his heat of the 400 m hurdles event in a season best time of 51.03 seconds. Two months later at the 2002 Asian Games in Busan, South Korea, Ditta finished seventh in the final of the 400 m hurdles stopping the clock at 51.22 seconds. Four years later at the 2006 South Asian Games in Colombo, Sri Lanka, Ditta won gold in the 400 m hurdles in 51 seconds flat. Four months later at the 2006 Asian Games in Doha, Qatar, Ditta finished fifth in his heat of the 400 m hurdles and failed to advance to the final.

References

1977 births
Living people
Pakistani male hurdlers
Commonwealth Games competitors for Pakistan
Asian Games competitors for Pakistan
Athletes (track and field) at the 2002 Commonwealth Games
Athletes (track and field) at the 2002 Asian Games
Athletes (track and field) at the 2006 Asian Games
Place of birth missing (living people)
South Asian Games gold medalists for Pakistan
South Asian Games medalists in athletics